Paulo César Silva Peixoto (born 12 May 1980) is a Portuguese former professional footballer who played mainly as a left midfielder but occasionally as a left-back, currently manager of F.C. Paços de Ferreira.

He amassed Primeira Liga totals of 205 matches and 25 goals over 13 seasons, representing in the competition Belenenses, Porto, Vitória de Guimarães, Braga, Benfica and Gil Vicente. He played once for Portugal.

Peixoto started working as a manager in 2019, leading Moreirense and Paços de Ferreira in the top flight.

Playing career

Club

Belenenses
After playing his first two professional seasons at lowly Clube Caçadores das Taipas, near Guimarães where he was born, Peixoto's ability as a left winger allowed him to jump from the fourth division straight into the Primeira Liga with C.F. Os Belenenses, thanks to former player João Cardoso.

He scored seven goals in his first year, one of them a long range shot closing a 3–0 win against FC Porto at the Estádio do Restelo. In July 2002 he signed with Porto, going on to be managed by José Mourinho.

Porto
Peixoto's Porto career did not go as planned; while talented, he failed to impose in the first team, and in his first season only made 15 appearances, scoring three goals. He was starting to make his presence felt in the starting XI when, after netting in two consecutive league matches in 4–1 wins, he was seriously injured in the UEFA Champions League 3–2 away victory over Olympique de Marseille on 22 October 2003 and, while it did not seem serious at first, on the next day a ruptured anterior cruciate ligament was diagnosed, which forced him to miss most of the campaign.

After his recovery, Peixoto crashed his Mercedes-Benz SL500 while speeding to arrive in time at Porto's training center in Vila Nova de Gaia, and while only getting minor bruises, the car was completely wrecked and he was promptly asked for explanations by Mourinho. His image as a professional suffered much from the accident, and midway through the following campaign he was loaned to Vitória de Guimarães where he regained his previous form, returning to Porto for 2005–06.

Facing another loan, Peixoto remained in the transfer list until the eleventh hour, being one of the final players to get a sit in the team. Following the internal problems with Nuno Valente and the sub par performances of Leandro, coach Co Adriaanse turned him into a prolific left back in the same fashion of Portuguese internationals Miguel or Paulo Ferreira (who played right midfielder during most of his under-21 career).

After having scored twice at Associação Naval 1º de Maio in a 3–2 win – he also netted an own goal– Peixoto again suffered a major knee injury that would keep him away from the pitch for the rest of the season, eliminating any hope of World Cup selection. He would be dismissed by Adriaanse and joined La Liga side RCD Espanyol on loan for 2006–07, finally cutting all ties with Porto in March 2007; previously, on 27 February, Espanyol had also terminated his contract as the player failed to make any competitive appearances for the Catalans.

Braga and Benfica
Peixoto signed a three-year contract with S.C. Braga on 29 May 2007. He declared himself delighted to join "...the fourth biggest team in Portugal."

After two intermittent seasons, Peixoto refused to take part in Braga's 2009–10 UEFA Europa League fixtures against IF Elfsborg, after reported interest from S.L. Benfica, thus being suspended. On 7 August 2009, a transfer deal between the two clubs was arranged for a fee of €400,000 – Braga retained 50% of the player's rights. He spent most of his first season playing as left-back, battling for position with another adapted player, Fábio Coentrão.

After appearing in 65 official games for Benfica (one goal, in a 6–0 away win against Grupo Desportivo e Recreativo Monsanto in the 2009–10 edition of the Taça de Portugal), Peixoto was deemed surplus to requirements by manager Jorge Jesus as practically all Portuguese players, and was not given a jersey for the 2011–12 campaign, being ultimately released from contract on 6 January 2012.

International
Aged 28, Peixoto earned his only cap for Portugal, appearing as an 84th-minute substitute for Maniche in a 6–2 friendly loss to Brazil on 19 November 2008. He was called up by Carlos Queiroz for the final games of 2010 FIFA World Cup qualification, but did not play.

Coaching career
Peixoto finished his career with Gil Vicente F.C. in 2014, at the age of 34. He started working as a manager on 11 March 2019, being appointed at LigaPro side Varzim SC. On 19 June that year, after succeeding in avoiding relegation, he moved to Associação Académica de Coimbra in the same league. He left his post five months later, having collected only nine points in ten matches.

On 19 December 2019, Peixoto signed with G.D. Chaves, succeeding José Mota at the team eighth in the second division. He had his first experience in the top division in November of the following year, when he replaced the departed Ricardo Soares at Moreirense F.C. on a short-term contract. Having won one of five league fixtures, he resigned on 2 January 2021.

Peixoto took over from Jorge Simão at F.C. Paços de Ferreira on 16 December 2021. Arriving with the team in 13th, he finished the season two places higher. He opened the following campaign with no wins and two points from nine games, and after a 2–0 loss to Liga 3 side Vitória de Setúbal in the third round of the cup on 16 October 2022 he was dismissed. He returned to the same job at the turn of the year, after his replacement Mota had resigned with no points from four games.

Personal life
From 2005 to 2007, Peixoto was married to actress and Rádio e Televisão de Portugal presenter Isabel Figueira. The couple had one child, a son.

On 3 January 2022, Peixoto tested positive for COVID-19.

Managerial statistics

Honours
Porto
Primeira Liga: 2002–03, 2003–04, 2005–06
Taça de Portugal: 2002–03
Supertaça Cândido de Oliveira: 2003, 2004
UEFA Champions League: 2003–04
UEFA Cup: 2002–03

Benfica
Primeira Liga: 2009–10
Taça da Liga: 2009–10, 2010–11
Supertaça Cândido de Oliveira runner-up: 2010

Gil Vicente
Taça da Liga runner-up: 2011–12

References

External links

1980 births
Living people
Sportspeople from Guimarães
Portuguese footballers
Association football defenders
Association football midfielders
Primeira Liga players
Segunda Divisão players
Clube Caçadores das Taipas players
C.F. Os Belenenses players
FC Porto players
Vitória S.C. players
S.C. Braga players
S.L. Benfica footballers
Gil Vicente F.C. players
RCD Espanyol footballers
UEFA Champions League winning players
UEFA Cup winning players
Portugal under-21 international footballers
Portugal international footballers
Portuguese expatriate footballers
Expatriate footballers in Spain
Portuguese expatriate sportspeople in Spain
Portuguese football managers
Primeira Liga managers
Liga Portugal 2 managers
Varzim S.C. managers
Associação Académica de Coimbra – O.A.F. managers
G.D. Chaves managers
Moreirense F.C. managers
F.C. Paços de Ferreira managers